The Mafia Triangle is a 1981 Italian "poliziottesco" film written and directed  by Alfonso Brescia and starring Mario Merola. It is an unofficial remake of Brescia's 1978 film Napoli … serenata calibro 9.

Plot

Cast
 Mario Merola as Don Gennaro Savarese
 Howard Ross as  Commissioner Galante
 Giacomo Rizzo as  Peppino
 Lucio Montanaro as  Bambinello
 Massimo Mollica as  Don Francesco 'O Biancone
 Liana Trouche as  Teresa
 Guido Alberti as Police Chief
 Biagio Pelligra as  Coppola
 Guido Leontini as  Malvasia
 Ugo Bologna as TV Manager
 Fabrizio Nascimbene as  Masaniello
 Nello Pazzafini as  Sgt. Martinez

See also   
 List of Italian films of 1981

References

External links
 

1980s crime films
Poliziotteschi films
Mafia films
1980s Italian-language films
1980s Italian films